Christian Westerman (born February 23, 1993) is a former American football offensive guard. He played college football at Arizona State. He was drafted by the Cincinnati Bengals in the fifth round of the 2016 NFL Draft.

High school career
A native of Chandler, Arizona, Westerman attended Hamilton High School, where he was an All-American offensive lineman. Regarded as a four-star recruit by Rivals.com, Westerman was ranked as the No. 3 offensive tackle in his class.

College career
Westerman attended Auburn University for two seasons before transferring to Arizona State University in December 2012.

Professional career

Westerman was drafted by the Bengals in the fifth round, 161st overall, in the 2016 NFL Draft.

On May 17, 2016, Westerman signed his four-year, $2.57 million rookie contract, with a signing bonus of $231,696. He was inactive for all but one game his rookie season and didn't record any snaps.

In 2017, Westerman started two games at left guard.

On August 16, 2019, the Bengals placed Westerman on the exempt/left squad list after announcing his plans to retire. However five days later, Westerman rejoined the team after deciding not to retire. He was waived during final roster cuts on August 30, 2019.

References

External links 
 Arizona State Sun Devils bio
 Auburn Tigers bio

1993 births
Living people
Sportspeople from Chandler, Arizona
Players of American football from Arizona
American football offensive guards
American football offensive tackles
Auburn Tigers football players
Arizona State Sun Devils football players
Cincinnati Bengals players